The John A. Finch Memorial Nurses Home in West Central, Spokane, Washington, also known as Finch Hall, was listed on the National Register of Historic Places in 1991.  It was designed by architects Whitehouse & Price.

References

National Register of Historic Places in Spokane, Washington
Buildings and structures in Spokane, Washington